Bugri is a surname. Notable people with the surname include:

 Francis Bugri (born 1980), German footballer
 Sam Bugri (born 1943), Ghanaian sprinter

See also
 Burgi (disambiguation)